Major-General Ivor John Caradoc Herbert, 1st Baron Treowen, CB, CMG, KStJ (15 July 1851 – 18 October 1933), known as Sir Ivor Herbert, Bt, between 1907 and 1917, was a British Liberal politician and British Army officer in the Grenadier Guards, who served as General Officer Commanding the Militia of Canada from 1890 to 1895.  He was made a baronet in 1907 and raised to a barony in 1917.

Background
Herbert was born at the family seat Llanarth Court, Llanarth in Monmouthshire, the eldest son of John Arthur Edward Herbert, formerly Arthur Jones, of Llanarth (1818–1895). In 1846 Ivor's father married Augusta Hall, the only surviving child and heir of Benjamin Hall, 1st Baron Llanover (1802–1867) and his wife Augusta Hall, Baroness Llanover. The marriage took place on 12 November 1846 and two years later, the father and his brothers assumed the name of Herbert by royal licence as the senior branch of the Herbert family. (Ironically, no member of this family had been known by that name, so the Jones family was actually taking the name of a junior and more well-known branch, the Herbert earls of Powis descended from an ancient Welsh Catholic family).

His mother was the Honourable Augusta Charlotte Elizabeth Hall, the only surviving daughter and sole heiress of Benjamin Hall, 1st Baron Llanover and his wife Augusta Waddington, better known as the Welsh cultural nationalist Lady Llanover, heiress of the considerable Llanover estate in Monmouthshire. He had two younger brothers, Edward Bleiddyn and Arthur (whose descendants still own Llanover today).

Military career

Herbert was a British Army officer, serving in the Grenadier Guards. He served as General Officer Commanding the Militia of Canada from 1890 to 1895. In 1896, he was Colonel in the Grenadier Guards.
He served in the Second Boer War in South Africa (1899-1902), where he was responsible for foreign representatives in the country.

Political career
Herbert was Member of Parliament (MP) for South Monmouthshire from 1906 until 1917. In 1907 he was created a Baronet, of Llanarth and Treowen in the county of Monmouth. On 20 June 1917 he was further honoured when he was raised to the peerage as Baron Treowen, of Treowen and Llanarth in the County of Monmouth.

As a Catholic, he made efforts to remove Cromwell's Statue from Westminster.

Family
Lord Treowen was married on 31 July 1873 in London to the Honourable Albertina Agnes Mary Denison (22 September 1854 – 20 October 1929 London), youngest daughter of the Albert Denison, 1st Baron Londesborough (himself a son of Henry Conyngham, 1st Marquess Conyngham and his wife, a mistress of George IV) and his second and younger daughter by his second wife, the former Ursula Bridgeman (later Lady Otho FitzGerald; she died 1883).

Lady Treowen founded and was the first President of the Ottawa Decorative Art Society. She was President of the Woman's Humane Society, and the first President of the Humane Society of Ottawa, and, had cabmen's shelters erected in Ottawa. As a member of the Band of Mercy Union, in 1892, she championed a resolution protesting against the use of the check-rein, and agreeing not to use or hire horses that were check-reined. She urged the erection of a national monument to Laura Secord. She was the honorary Secretary to an organization that raised a fund by the women of Canada to present a wedding gift to the Prince and Princess of Wales. Lord and Lady Treowen had two children.

 Hon. Fflorens Mary Ursula Herbert (12 February 1879 - 18 March 1969) Girl Guiding's Chief Commissioner of Wales from 1924 to 1928,. Married Walter Francis Roch (20 January 1880 – 3 March 1965).
 Hon. Elydir John Bernard Herbert (13 January 1881 – 12 November 1917) died in Balin, Palestine, aged 36. He was unmarried. Elydir Herbert, who had been awarded the Order of the White Eagle by Serbia, died while on service in the First World War with the Royal Gloucestershire Hussars. He is buried in Gaza War Cemetery.

The estate Llanarth, near Llanover (also owned by the Herbert family) is still owned privately. According to the estate's site, the estates are all near Abergavenny. Both Llanarth and Llanover are privately owned estate villages within a conservation area.  For maps, see The baronetcy and barony became extinct on Lord Treowen's death.

Honours
 CB   : Companion of the Order of the Bath
 CMG: Companion of the Order of St Michael and St George
 Commander of the Order of the Crown of Italy - 1901 - in recognition of his services when in charge of Italian and other foreign representatives in South Africa
 Officer of the French Legion d'Honneur - 1902 - in recognition of his services when in charge of the foreign representatives attached to the British Army in South Africa

References

External links
 A short history of the Jones, later Herbert, family up to the death of Lord Treowen gives some details on the name change in 1848 by Royal Licence Retrieved 10 August 2007.
 Photograph of the exterior of Llanarth Court, the family home and seat of Lord Treowen, near Raglan, in Monmouthshire. The house is now a private hospital. Retrieved 10 August 2007.
 Treowen, now a private hotel The house, in Monmouthshire, was probably built in 1627. By the 1670s, the Jones family (to rename themselves Herbert in the 1800s) moved to Llanarth Court, near Abergavenny, which had by tradition been the residence of the eldest son. Treowen remained in the family until 1945, but was let as a farmhouse. Floor plans of the house are available. Retrieved 10 August 2007.
  Location of Treowen from which Lord Treowen took his name. Retrieved 10 August 2007.

1851 births
1933 deaths
British Army generals
Companions of the Order of the Bath
Companions of the Order of St Michael and St George
Knights of Justice of the Order of St John
Barons in the Peerage of the United Kingdom
Lord-Lieutenants of Monmouthshire
Herbert, Ivor
Herbert, Ivor
Herbert, Ivor
Commanders of the Canadian Army
Herbert, Ivor
UK MPs who were granted peerages
Grenadier Guards officers
Canadian generals
Barons created by George V